Antonio Rizzo (born 28 March 1981) is an Italian former footballer who played as a defender. Rizzo holds a certificate in youth coaching.

Career

Early career
Rizzo started his career at A.S. Roma. He joined Serie C2 side Gubbio in co-ownership deal. In summer 2003, he joined Serie B side Fiorentina who promoted from Serie C2 in co-ownership for €77,500 from Roma. In June 2004, Roma gave up the remain 50% registration rights to La Viola for free. La Viola loaned him to Serie C1 side Spezia, which he won Coppa Italia Serie C.

Perugia
In summer 2005, he joined Serie C1 side Perugia in co-ownership deal for a peppercorn of €500, but failed to play regularly in the first season. In June 2006 Perugia acquired all the rights. He signed a contract extension in April 2007 which last until June 2009.

Reggina and loans
In January 2008, he was signed by Serie A side Reggina but loaned back to Perugia. In summer 2008, he joined Cremonese of Lega Pro Prima Divisione. But in mid-season, he joined league rival Ravenna, swapped with Fabrizio Anzalone. In July 2009, he remained at Ravenna and joined with Reggina "team-mate" Tommaso Squillace and Josias Basso Lisboa on loan.

Cosenza and retirement
On 13 January 2011 Alessandro Bernardi moved to Reggio Calabria; Rizzo left for Cosenza as part of the deal. On 30 June 2012 he qualified as a youth coach.

References

External links
 
 Profile at AIC.Football.it 

1981 births
Living people
People from Civitavecchia
Italian footballers
Serie B players
A.S. Roma players
ACF Fiorentina players
Spezia Calcio players
A.C. Perugia Calcio players
Reggina 1914 players
U.S. Cremonese players
Ravenna F.C. players
Association football defenders
A.S. Gubbio 1910 players
Footballers from Lazio
Sportspeople from the Metropolitan City of Rome Capital